Pine Lake is a lake located north of Indian Lake, New York. Fish species present in the lake are brook trout, white sucker, rock bass, black bullhead, and sunfish.

References

Lakes of New York (state)
Lakes of Hamilton County, New York
Lakes of Essex County, New York